Master of National Comics (Mestre do Quadrinho Nacional, in Portuguese) is one of the categories of Prêmio Angelo Agostini, the most traditional Brazilian award dedicated to comics that has been held since 1985 by Associação dos Quadrinhistas e Caricaturistas do Estado de São Paulo (AQC-ESP).

History 

The "Master of National Comics" category has been part of Prêmio Angelo Agostini since its first edition, in 1985. It is aimed to reward artists who have been dedicated to Brazilian comics for at least 25 years. The four honorees of this first edition were chosen by AQC-ESP board. The following year, the winners were elected by open vote for members of AQC-ESP and comics artists associations from other Brazilian states (and, later, for any interested person, whether comics professionals or readers).

The Angelo Agostini's 18th edition, in 2002, exceptionally awarded 13 people as "Master of National Comics" instead of the traditional three names. This would be a tribute to the "majority" of the event (it was "turning 18 years old"). It was the largest number of winners in this category in the same edition.

As of the 2006 edition, the sending of voting ballots, which until then could only be done by mail, also started to occur by e-mail. A new change was made in the 2013 edition: votes were now registered directly on the AQC-ESP's official blog, which resulted in a large increase in the number of votes (14,937 in this edition against a total that hardly exceeded 500 in previous editions).

In 2007, only living artists became eligible for the award (until the previous year, the trophy was awarded posthumously several times). Due to this change, all deceased artists who were part of the list that AQC-ESP published annually of people eligible for the category were automatically defined by the organizing committee as "Masters in memoriam".

Since 2017, the winners of this category became chosen by the organizing committee and no longer by voters. The only exception to this new criterion was in the 2019 edition (when that was chosen by open voting), but in the following edition the definition of the winners in this category was again made by the organizing committee.

Due to the COVID-19 pandemic, the 36th Angelo Agostini Award, which should have taken place in 2020, was held in January 2021. This problem reoccurred in the next edition, focused on the production of 2020 comics, but which had its vote postponed to early 2022. The schedule was regularized in 2022 with the 38th edition of the award being held in the second half of the year.

Winners and nominees

See also 
 List of Prêmio Angelo Agostini winners

Notes

References 

Master of National Comics
Brazilian comics
Brazilian awards
Comics award winners
Comics-related lists
Lists of award winners